Vassa Larin (born Varvara Georgievna Larina, ; December 11, 1970) is an American Russian Orthodox ryassofor nun, the host of the popular show "Coffee with Sr. Vassa", author of many scholarly articles and a monograph on Byzantine liturgy and theology, and an outspoken public intellectual on current issues of the Russian Orthodox Church Outside Russia (ROCOR). She teaches Liturgical Studies at the Catholic Theological Faculty of the University of Vienna in Austria.

Larin is a member of the Commission of the Inter-Council Presence of the Russian Orthodox Church: the Commission on Liturgy and Church Art, and the Commission of the Inter-Council Presence of the Russian Orthodox Church: the Commission on Canon Law.

Biography
Born to the family of a Russian Orthodox priest in Nyack, New York, Larin graduated from Nyack High School and entered Bryn Mawr College in Bryn Mawr, Pennsylvania, at the age of 16. She left college to enter the Lesna Convent of the ROCOR in Provement, France, at age 19. After ten years in France, she spent two years at the Mount of Olives Convent in Jerusalem. Following a long spiritual and academic novitiate training, involving the study of Greek, Latin, German, Patristic Theology and Church History, Vassa was eventually enrolled by Archbishop Mark (Arndt) of Berlin and Germany to study Orthodox Theology at the Orthodox Institute of the Ludwig Maximilian University of Munich, Germany. There she received a master's degree in Orthodox Theology, having written a Master’s Thesis on the “Royal Office” at the beginning of Byzantine Orthros.

In 2006-2008 she worked as the Graduate Assistant of the renowned expert on Byzantine Liturgy, Professor Robert F. Taft, S.J., at the Pontifical Oriental Institute in Rome. Taft directed Sr. Vassa’s doctoral dissertation on the Byzantine hierarchal liturgy, which she defended summa cum laude at the Orthodox Institute of the Ludwig Maximilian University of Munich in December 2008. Larin’s dissertation, The Byzantine Hierarchal Divine Liturgy in Arsenij Suxanov’s Proskinitarij, was published in 2010 as volume 286 of the academic series Orientalia Christiana Analecta.

Beginning in January 2009 Larin taught Liturgical Studies at the Catholic Faculty of the University of Vienna in Austria. She now works full-time on her on-line catechetical ministry 'Coffee with Sister Vassa'. She is a founding member of the Society of Oriental Liturgies, and a member of the North American Academy of Liturgy. In 2012 Larin was included in the 30th Anniversary Edition of Marquis Who’s Who in the World.

Writings
Her numerous publications, written in English, Russian, or German, include scholarly studies based on original manuscript-research, as well as articles on controversial topics in contemporary Orthodoxy. Especially noteworthy are her following publications:
 The Byzantine Hierarchal Divine Liturgy in Arsenij Suxanov’s Proskinitarij (Orientalia Christiana Analecta 286) Rome 2010.
 “What is Ritual Im/Purity and Why?” St. Vladimir’s Theological Quarterly 52: 3-4 (2008) 275-92.
 “The Dikerion and Trikerion of the Byzantine Pontifical Rite: Origins and Significance,” Orientalia Christiana Periodica 74 (2008) 417-430.
 “The Ecclesiastical Principle of Oikonomia and the ROCOR,” electronically published in Russian original and English translation on the ROCOR’s official website.

References

External links
Full CV and Bibliography on the website of the Catholic Theological Faculty of Vienna University
Works available online on personal website of Michael Zheltov
 Video of Sr. Vassa’s lecture, “Why Study the History of the Liturgy?” (June 2012)
Audio of Sr. Vassa’s lecture, “The Active Participation of the Laity and the Byzantine Liturgy” (June 2012) on Ancient Faith Radio
Interview for ROCOR-Studies website, “Orthodoxy is Not a Religion of Fear” (May 4, 2009)
 Interview for ROCOR-Studies website, “Orthodoxy: Affirmation, Not Negation” (September 4, 2009)

1970 births
Living people
Ludwig Maximilian University of Munich alumni
American people of Russian descent
20th-century American nuns
Academic staff of the University of Vienna
Russian Orthodox Christians from the United States
20th-century Eastern Orthodox nuns
American women academics
21st-century American nuns
21st-century Eastern Orthodox nuns